Helen Margaret George (1883–1982) was an English artist and sculptor.

Biography
George was born in Blandford, Dorset and was educated at Talbot Heath School in Bournemouth and she then studied sculpture in Paris under Antoine Bourdelle. She exhibited sculptures and group compositions, often on the theme of motherhood, at the Royal Academy in London, with the Royal Society of British Sculptors, the Society of Women Artists and at the Leicester Galleries and the Goupil Gallery during the inter-war period. George exhibited widely in America and in Paris at both the Salon des Artistes Francais and the Salon d'Automne. The Victoria and Albert Museum in London, Salford Museum and Art Gallery and Manchester City Art Gallery all hold examples of her work.

References

1883 births
1982 deaths
20th-century British sculptors
20th-century English women artists
English women sculptors
People educated at Talbot Heath School
Artists from Dorset